Mladkov is a market town in Ústí nad Orlicí District in the Pardubice Region of the Czech Republic. It has about 500 inhabitants.

Administrative parts
Villages of Dolany, Petrovičky and Vlčkovice are administrative parts of Mladkov.

History
The first written mention of Mladkov is from 1350.

Mladkov, as a part of German-settled Sudetenland, was annexed by Nazi Germany in 1938. After the World War II the German population was expelled.

Notable people
Gudrun Pausewang (1928–2020), German children's writer
Freya Pausewang (1932–2020), German writer

References

External links

Market towns in the Czech Republic
Populated places in Ústí nad Orlicí District